Louis Ellis Nordyke (August 7, 1876 – September 27, 1945) was an American Major League Baseball first baseman who played for the St. Louis Browns for one season, from April 18 to June 27, 1906.  He was sold to the Browns by the Tacoma Tigers of the Pacific Coast League, after having previously been on their Champion 1904–1905 team.  He was a popular player with both fans and his fellow players in 1903, when he played for the Spokane Indians, also of the PCL.  Nordyke later rejoined the team in 1909, and won the league's batting championship.  He also played for the 1907 St. Paul Saints.  In total, Nordyke played professional baseball from 1901 to 1914.

After his baseball career, he spent time as a security guard at a bank.  Nordyke died at the age of 69, of a heart attack in Los Angeles.  His remains were cremated and interred at Forest Lawn Memorial Park in Glendale, California.

References

External links

1876 births
1945 deaths
Major League Baseball first basemen
19th-century baseball players
St. Louis Browns players
Minor league baseball managers
Bay City Sugar Citys players
Grand Rapids Cabinet Makers players
Detroit Tigers (Western League) players
Chatham Reds players
Mansfield Haymakers players
San Francisco Wasps players
San Francisco (minor league baseball) players
Tacoma Tigers players
Spokane Indians players
St. Paul Saints (AA) players
Vancouver Beavers players
Victoria Bees players
Sportspeople from Brooklyn
Baseball players from New York City
Baseball players from Iowa
People from Washington County, Iowa
Burials at Forest Lawn Memorial Park (Glendale)
Security guards